James Michael Heaton (15 January 1947 – 11 April 1995) was an English former football full-back. He played in the Football League for Blackburn Rovers and captained them to the 1975 Third Division Championship. He later coached Blackburn and Everton alongside Howard Kendall, and was an integral, yet underrated part of the Everton management team that won two league titles, an FA Cup, and a European Cup Winner’s Cup. Heaton died in a car accident in 1995

References

1947 births
Association football fullbacks
English footballers
Blackburn Rovers F.C. players
1995 deaths